Tsang Tsz Hin (born 27 October 1995) is a former Hong Kong professional footballer who plays as a defender or a midfielder and currently plays for Hong Kong First Division club Eastern District. 

He is the son of Tsang Wai Chung, former head coach of South China and Hong Kong.

References

External links
HKFA

1995 births
Living people
Hong Kong footballers
Association football defenders
Association football midfielders
Southern District FC players
Tai Po FC players
Resources Capital FC players
Hoi King SA players
Yuen Long FC players
Hong Kong Premier League players
Hong Kong First Division League players